Bernard Okorowanta (born 11 December 1986) is a Nigerian midfielder who plays for Warri Wolves F.C.

Career
He started his career with Union Bank F.C. then moved to top Israeli side Maccabi Tel Aviv.

Personal life
Bernard is the younger brother of ex-international, Tarila Okorowanta. He derives inspiration from the person who bought him his first boots.

References

External links
 
 

1986 births
Living people
Nigerian footballers
Maccabi Tel Aviv F.C. players
Bayelsa United F.C. players
Hakoah Maccabi Amidar Ramat Gan F.C. players
Expatriate footballers in Israel
Sivasspor footballers
Union Bank F.C. players
Association football midfielders